The Gran Chaco or Dry Chaco is a sparsely populated, hot and semiarid lowland natural region of the Río de la Plata basin, divided among eastern Bolivia, western Paraguay, northern Argentina, and a portion of the Brazilian states of Mato Grosso and Mato Grosso do Sul, where it is connected with the Pantanal region. This land is sometimes called the Chaco Plain.

Toponymy
The name Chaco comes from a word in Quechua, an indigenous language from the Andes and highlands of South America. The Quechua word chaqu meaning "hunting land" comes probably from the rich variety of animal life present throughout the entire region.

Geography
   
The Gran Chaco is about 647,500 km² (250,000 sq mi) in size, though estimates differ. It is located west of the Paraguay River and east of the Andes, and is mostly an alluvial sedimentary plain shared among Paraguay, Bolivia, and Argentina. It stretches from about 17 to 33°S latitude and between 65 and 60°W longitude, though estimates differ.

Historically, the Chaco has been divided in three main parts: the Chaco Austral or Southern Chaco, south of the Bermejo River and inside Argentinian territory, blending into the Pampa region in its southernmost end; the Chaco Central or Central Chaco between the Bermejo and the Pilcomayo River to the north, also now in Argentinian territory; and the Chaco Boreal or Northern Chaco, north of the Pilcomayo up to the Brazilian Pantanal, inside Paraguayan territory and sharing some area with Bolivia.

Locals sometimes divide it today by the political borders, giving rise to the terms Argentinian Chaco, Paraguayan Chaco, and Bolivian Chaco. (Inside Paraguay, people sometimes use the expression Central Chaco for the area roughly in the middle of the Chaco Boreal, where Mennonite colonies are established.)

The Chaco Boreal may be divided in two: closer to the mountains in the west, the Alto Chaco (Upper Chaco), sometimes known as Chaco Seco (or Dry Chaco), is very dry and sparsely vegetated. To the east, less arid conditions combined with favorable soil characteristics permit a seasonally dry higher-growth thorn tree forest, and further east still higher rainfall combined with improperly drained lowland soils result in a somewhat swampy plain called the Bajo Chaco (Lower Chaco), sometimes known as Chaco Húmedo (Humid Chaco). It has a more open savanna vegetation consisting of palm trees, quebracho trees, and tropical high-grass areas, with a wealth of insects. The landscape is mostly flat and slopes at a 0.004-degree gradient to the east. This area is also one of the distinct physiographic provinces of the Parana-Paraguay Plain division.

The areas more hospitable to development are along the Paraguay, Bermejo, and Pilcomayo Rivers. It is a great source of timber and tannin, which is derived from the native quebracho tree. Special tannin factories have been constructed there. The wood of the palo santo from the Central Chaco is the source of oil of guaiac (a fragrance for soap). Paraguay also cultivates mate in the lower part of the Chaco.

Large tracts of the central and northern Chaco have high soil fertility, sandy alluvial soils with elevated levels of phosphorus, and a topography that is favorable for agricultural development. Other aspects are challenging for farming: a semiarid to semihumid climate (600–1300 mm annual rainfall) with a six-month dry season and sufficient fresh groundwater restricted to roughly one-third of the region, two-thirds being without groundwater or with groundwater of high salinity. Soils are generally erosion-prone once the forest has been cleared. In the central and northern Paraguay Chaco, occasional dust storms have caused major topsoil loss.

History
The Chaco was occupied by nomadic peoples, notably the various groups making up the Guaycuru, who resisted Spanish control of the Chaco, often with success, from the 16th until the early 20th centuries.

Prior to national independence of the nations that compose the Chaco, the entire area was a separate colonial region named by the Spaniards as Chiquitos.

The Gran Chaco had been a disputed territory since 1810. Officially, it was supposed to be part of Argentina, Bolivia, and Paraguay, although a bigger land portion west of the Paraguay River had belonged to Paraguay since its independence. Argentina claimed territories north of the Bermejo River until Paraguay's defeat in the War of the Triple Alliance in 1870 established its current border with Argentina.

Over the next few decades, Bolivia began to push the natives out and settle in the Gran Chaco, while Paraguay ignored it. Bolivia sought the Paraguay River for shipping oil out into the sea (it had become a land-locked country after the loss of its Pacific coast in the War of the Pacific), and Paraguay claimed ownership of the land. This became the backdrop to the Gran Chaco War (1932–1935) between Paraguay and Bolivia over supposed oil in the Chaco Boreal (the aforementioned region north of the Pilcomayo River and to the west of the Paraguay River). Eventually, Argentine Foreign Minister Carlos Saavedra Lamas mediated a ceasefire and subsequent treaty signed in 1938, which gave Paraguay three-quarters of the Chaco Boreal and gave Bolivia a corridor to the Paraguay River with the ability to use the Puerto Casado and the right to construct their own port. No oil was found in the region until 2012 when Paraguayan President Federico Franco announced the discovery of oil in the area of the Pirity river.

 
Mennonites immigrated into the Paraguayan part of the region from Canada in the 1920s; more came from the USSR in the 1930s and immediately following World War II. These immigrants created some of the largest and most prosperous municipalities in the deep Gran Chaco.

The region is home to over 9 million people, divided about evenly among Argentina, Bolivia, and Brazil, and including around 100,000 in Paraguay. The area remains relatively underdeveloped, In the 1960s, the Paraguayan authorities constructed the Trans-Chaco Highway and the Argentine National Highway Directorate, National Routes 16 and 81, in an effort to encourage access and development.

Flora
  
The Gran Chaco has some of the highest temperatures on the continent.

It has high biodiversity, containing around 3,400 plant species, 500 birds, 150 mammals, and 220 reptiles and amphibians.

The floral characteristics of the Gran Chaco are varied given the large geographical span of the region. The dominant vegetative structure is xerophytic deciduous forests with multiple layers, including a canopy (trees), subcanopy, shrub layer, and herbaceous layer. Ecosystems include riverine forests, wetlands, savannas, and cactus stands, as well.

At higher elevations of the eastern zone of the Humid Chaco, mature forests transition from the wet forests of southern Brazil. These woodlands are dominated by canopy trees such as Handroanthus impetiginosus and characterized by frequent lianas and epiphytes. This declines to seasonally flooded forests, at lower elevations, that are dominated by Schinopsis spp., a common plains tree genus often harvested for its tannin content and dense wood. The understory comprises bromeliad and cactus species, as well as hardy shrubs such as Schinus fasciculata. These lower areas lack lianas, but have abundant epiphytic species such as Tillandsia. The river systems that flow through the area, such as the Rio Paraguay and Rio Parana, allow for seasonally flooded semievergreen gallery forests that hold riparian species such as Tessaria integrifolia and Salix humboldtiana. Other seasonally flooded ecosystems of this area include palm-dominated (Copernicia alba) savannas with a bunch grass-dominated herbaceous layer.

To the west, in the Semiarid/Arid Chaco, medium-sized forests consists of white quebracho (Aspidosperma quebracho-blanco) and red quebracho (Schinopsis lorentzii) with a slightly shorter subcanopy made up of several species from the family Fabaceae, as well as several arboreal cacti species that distinguish this area of the Chaco. There is a scrub-like shrub and herbaceous understory. On sandy soils, the thick woodlands turn into savannas where the aforementioned species prevail, as well as species such as Jacaranda mimosifolia. The giant Stetsonia coryne, found throughout the western Semiarid/Arid region becomes very conspicuous in these sandy savannas. Various upland systems of plant associations occur throughout the Gran Chaco. The Highlands of the Argentinian Chaco are made up of, on the dry, sunny side (up to 1800m), Schinopsis haenkeana woodlands. The cooler side of the uplands hosts Zanthoxylum coco (locally referred to as Fagara coco) and Schinus molleoides (locally referred to as Lithrea molleoides) as the predominant species. Other notable species include Bougainvillea stipitata, and several species from the Fabaceae. The Paraguyan uplands have other woodland slope ecosystems, notably, those dominated by Anadenanthera colubrina on moist slopes. Both of these upland systems, as well as numerous other Gran Chaco areas, are rich with endemism.

Fauna
Faunal diversity in the Gran Chaco is also high. The Gran Chaco has around 3,400 plant, 500 bird, 150 mammal, and 220 reptile and amphibian species. Animals typically associated with tropical and subtropical forests are often found throughout the eastern Humid Chaco, including jaguars, howler monkeys, peccaries, deer, and tapirs. Edentate species, including anteaters and armadillos, are readily seen here, as well. Being home to at least 10 species, the Argentinian Chaco is the location of the peak diversity for the armadillo, including species such as the nine-banded armadillo (Dasypus novemcinctus), whose range extends north to the southern US, and the southern three-banded armadillo (Tolypeutes matacus). The pink fairy armadillo (Chlamyphrous truncatus), is found nowhere else in the world. The giant armadillo (Priodontes maximus), while not found in the eastern Humid Chaco, can be seen in the drier Arid Chaco of the west.  Some other notable endemics of the region include the San Luis tuco-tuco (Ctenomys pontifex). This small rodent is only found in the Argentinian Chaco. All of 60 species of Ctenomys are endemic to  South America. The Chacoan peccary (Catagonus wagneri), locally known as tauga, is the largest of the three peccary species found in the area. This species was thought to be extinct by scientists until 1975, when it was recorded by Ralph Wetzel.

Due to the climate of the Gran Chaco, herpetofauna are restricted to moist refugia in various places throughout the chaco. Rotting logs, debris piles, old housing settlement, wells, and seasonal farm ponds are examples of such refugia. The black-legged seriema (Chunga burmeisteri), blue-crowned parakeet (Aratinga acuticadauta), Picui ground dove (Columbina picui), guira cuckoo (Guira guira), little thornbird (Phacellodomus sibilatrix), and many-colored Chaco finch (Saltaitricula multicolor) are notable of the 409 bird species that are resident or breed in the Gran Chaco; 252 of these Chaco species are endemic to South America.

Conservation issues

The Chaco is one of South America's last agricultural frontiers. Very sparsely populated and lacking sufficient all-weather roads and basic infrastructure (the Argentinian part is more developed than the Paraguayan or Bolivian part), it has long been too remote for crop planting. The central Chaco's Mennonite colonies are a notable exception.

Two factors may substantially change the Chaco in the near future: low land valuations and the region's suitability to grow fuel crops. Suitability for the cultivation of Jatropha has been proven. Sweet sorghum as an ethanol plant may prove viable, too, since sorghum is a traditional local crop for domestic and feedstock use. The feasibility of switchgrass is currently being studied by Argentina's Instituto Nacional de Tecnología Agropecuaria, as is the Karanda’y palm tree in the Paraguayan Chaco.

While advancements in agriculture can bring some improvements in infrastructure and employment for the region, loss of habitat and virgin forest is substantial and will likely increase poverty. In mid-2009, a projected law, initiated by the Liberal Party, that would have outlawed deforestation in the Paraguayan Chaco altogether, "Deforestacion Zero en el Chaco" did not get a majority in the parliament.

According to Fundación Avina, a local NGO, on average,  are cleared per day. The soy plantations not only eliminate the forest, but also other types of agriculture. Indigenous communities are losing their land to agribusinesses. Since 2007, a law is supposed to regulate and control the cutting of timber in the Gran Chaco, but illegal logging continues.

Among the aggressive investors in the Paraguayan Gran Chaco are U.S.-based agribusinesses Cargill Inc., Bunge Ltd., and Archer Daniels Midland Co.

Protected areas
A 2017 assessment found that 176,715 km², or 22%, of the ecoregion is in protected areas.

In September 1995, the Kaa-Iya del Gran Chaco National Park and Integrated Management Natural Area was established in an area of the Chaco in Bolivia. It is administered and was established solely by the indigenous peoples, including the Izoceño Guaraní, the Ayoreode, and the Chiquitano.

Other protected areas include Defensores del Chaco National Park and Tinfunqué National Park in Paraguay, and Copo National Park and El Impenetrable National Park in Argentina.

Administrative divisions in the Gran Chaco

 
The following Argentine provinces, Bolivian and Paraguayan departments, and Brazilian states lie in the Gran Chaco area, either entirely or in part.

Indigenous peoples

 Abipón, Argentina, historic group
 Angaite (Angate), northwestern Paraguay
 Ayoreo (Morotoco, Moro, Zamuco), Bolivia and Paraguay
 Chamacoco (Zamuko), Paraguay
 Chané, Argentina and Bolivia
 Chiquitano (Chiquito, Tarapecosi), eastern Bolivia
 Chorote (Choroti), Iyojwa'ja Chorote, Manjuy), Argentina, Bolivia, and Paraguay
 Guana (Kaskihá), Paraguay
 Guaraní, Argentina, Bolivia, Brazil, and Paraguay
 Bolivian Guarani
 Eastern Guarani (Chiriguano), Bolivia
 Guarayo (East Bolivian Guarani)
 Chiripá (Tsiripá, Ava), Bolivia
 Pai Tavytera (Pai, Montese, Ava), Bolivia
 Tapieté (Guaraní Ñandéva, Yanaigua), eastern Bolivia
 Yuqui (Bia), Bolivia
 Guaycuru peoples, Argentina, Bolivia, Brazil, and Paraguay
 Mbayá (Caduveo), historic
 Kadiweu, Brazil
 Mocoví (Mocobí), Argentina
 Payaguá
 Pilagá (Pilage Toba)
 Toba (Qom, Frentones), Argentina, Bolivia, and Paraguay
 Kaiwá, Argentina and Brazil
 Lengua people (Enxet), Paraguay
 North Lengua (Eenthlit, Enlhet, Maskoy), Paraguay
 South Lengua, Paraguay
 Lulé (Pelé, Tonocoté), Argentina
 Maká (Towolhi), Paraguay
 Nivaclé (Ashlushlay, Chulupí, Chulupe, Guentusé), Argentina, and Paraguay
 Sanapaná (Quiativis), Paraguay
 Vilela, Argentina
 Wichí (Mataco), Argentina and Bolivia

Many of these peoples speak or used to speak Mataco–Guaicuru languages.

See also 
 Campo del Cielo
 Kaa-Iya del Gran Chaco National Park and Integrated Management Natural Area
 Tributaries of the Río de la Plata

References

External links

 The National Museum of Natural History's description of Gran Chaco
 
 photos of the Paraguay Chaco

 
La Plata basin
Natural regions of South America
Regions of Argentina
Regions of Bolivia
Regions of Paraguay
Ecoregions of South America
Ecoregions of Argentina
Ecoregions of Bolivia
Ecoregions of Brazil
Ecoregions of Paraguay
Grasslands of Argentina
Grasslands of Bolivia
Grasslands of Brazil
Grasslands of Paraguay
Grasslands of South America
Geography of Argentina
Geography of Bolivia
Geography of Mato Grosso
Geography of Mato Grosso do Sul
Geography of Paraguay
Divided regions
Environment of Mato Grosso
Environment of Mato Grosso do Sul
Quechua words and phrases
Physiographic provinces
Neotropical dry broadleaf forests